Rodneyse Bichotte Hermelyn (born December 2, 1972) is an American politician who serves as the Assembly Member for the 42nd District of the New York State Assembly. She is a Democrat. The district includes portions of East Flatbush, Flatbush, Ditmas Park, and Midwood, in Brooklyn.

Bichotte Hermelyn was the first Haitian-American to be elected to the State Legislature from New York City, as well as Chair of the Kings County Democratic Committee.

Early life and education
Bichotte Hermelyn was born and raised in Brooklyn, New York to Haitian immigrants, and attended public schools, graduating from LaGuardia High School. She has a B.S. in electrical engineering from SUNY Buffalo, a B.S. in mathematics in secondary education and a B.T. in electrical engineering from Buffalo State College, an M.B.A from Northwestern University, and an M.S. from the Illinois Institute of Technology. She is also an alumna of The White House Project, a leadership program created by Brooklyn College.

On January 1, 2020, she married Brooklyn District Leader Edu Hermelyn.

Career
Prior to public service, Bichotte Hermelyn was an engineer working in Japan and China. She is known as an avid traveler, and has traveled to seven countries on the continent of Africa,  as well as several countries in Asia, Europe, Latin America and the Middle East, including Israel.

Bichotte Hermelyn serves as a Democratic District Leader for her district in Brooklyn.

New York Assembly
In 2012, Bichotte Hermelyn opted to take on longtime Assemblywoman Rhoda Jacobs, who despite fast-changing demographic shifts had won the 42nd District easily as a white, Jewish woman in an African-American, Caribbean community. Bichotte Hermelyn, who is of Haitian descent, challenged Jacobs in the Democratic primary, but lost to the incumbent 67% to 32%.

The following cycle in 2014, Jacobs decided to retire, and Bichotte Hermelyn announced her campaign for the Assembly. In a four-way primary, Bichotte Hermelyn won the nomination with 48% of the vote. In the safely-Democratic seat, she went on to win the general election with over 90% of the vote.

Bichotte Hermelyn was sworn into office on January 1, 2015, with New York City Mayor Bill de Blasio administering the oath of office. In the Assembly, she serves as Chair of the Subcommittee on Oversight of Minority and Women-Owned Business Enterprises (MWBEs).

In 2023, Bichotte Hermelyn was appointed Majority Whip for the Democratic Caucus of the New York State Assembly.

Brooklyn Democratic Party 
In January 2020, Bichotte Hermelyn was chosen to succeed Frank Seddio as Brooklyn Democratic Party Chair, making her both the first woman and first African-American woman to lead a county party in New York City.

In August 2022, a closed-door meeting of the Brooklyn Democratic Party Executive Committee voted to consolidate power in Bichotte Hermelyn's hands, where the Committee passed several rule changes meant to blunt the ability of the newly-elected County Committee reformist bloc to enact democratizing reforms.

References

External links
 New York State Assemblywoman Rodneyse Bichotte Hermelyn official site

1972 births
21st-century American politicians
21st-century American women politicians
American people of Haitian descent
Living people
Democratic Party members of the New York State Assembly
People from Brooklyn
University at Buffalo alumni
Women state legislators in New York (state)